Brightcove, Inc. is a Boston, Massachusetts–based software company that produces an online video platform.

History 

Brightcove was founded in 2004 by Jeremy Allaire, who served as Executive Chairman until April 2016, and Bob Mason. The company was  named after a harbor where the founder liked to kayak named Bright Cove Harbor in Cape Cod, Massachusetts.

In March 2006, Brightcove acquired Seattle-based Metastories, makers of StoryMaker, a publishing tool for video, audio, images, and text. In May of that year, it established a distribution partnership with TiVo and a  content delivery partnership with Limelight Networks.

Coinciding with a series of deals with UK media companies, Brightcove opened an office in London in July 2007.

In November 2009, Brightcove was named as one of the top two U.S. video platform vendors.

In April 2010, it was reported that Brightcove raised $12 million in fourth-round funding, nearing a total of $100 million, but still barely breaking even with the projected $50 million in annual revenue.

In August 2010, Brightcove announced a content delivery partnership with Akamai Technologies. Along with Akamai Technologies, its other partnerships include the ones with Sitecore, Cleeng, FreeWheel, YuMe, Conviva, Oracle, DoubleClick, and other organizations.

As a public company
Brightcove went public in February 2012 with their stock priced at $11 per share. The price of the stock during the summer of 2017 was $7 per share, with the stock down 38 percent in the past year.

In July 2017, the company announced that CEO David Mendels agreed to step down as of July 31, 2017.  Andrew Feinberg, previously Brightcove's president and chief operating officer was named acting CEO until April 2018 when Jeff Ray was appointed as the new CEO.

Internet TV partnerships 
In December 2005 Brightcove partnered with Reuters to create a program to syndicate customized news video players.

In 2006, Brightcove completed Internet TV partnership deals with a number of large media companies including The New York Times Company (NYTimes.com and About.com), Discovery Communications (Discovery Channel, Travel Channel), and Sony BMG among others.

In 2007, Brightcove capitalized on a trend of magazine and newspaper publishers expanding into online video by signing deals with print media companies including Time Inc., TV Guide, and Washingtonpost.Newsweek Interactive.

Since then, a number of television and cable media companies have begun to use Brightcove as an alternate, non-exclusive distribution channel for their video content.

Brightcove Studio 
The Brightcove Studio was home to the Brightcove Internet TV platform.  Geared toward professional video publishers, the studio was used to create, customize, distribute, and monetize video player widgets. Videos, lineups, players, and online channels were all created and managed through a content management system called the Brightcove Console, an Adobe Flex-based internet application.  Monetization was achieved through video sales and advertising.

Former services

Brightcove.tv 
Brightcove.tv was a video website dedicated to promoting Brightcove content.  Every publisher who created a Brightcove account was assigned a channel, their own page on Brightcove.tv.

Publishers could customize their channel through the Brightcove Console.  Simple details like the channel's name, logo, and description could be updated in the user's profile.  The content of a channel was defined by changing the settings of individual titles, lineups, and players to allow distribution and promotion on Brightcove.tv.

On December 17, 2008, Brightcove shut down Brightcove Network accounts that had not been upgraded to paid Brightcove platform accounts. At the same time, they shut down the Brightcove.TV website (which is separate from the corporate Brightcove website).

App Cloud 
In May 2011, Brightcove announced its App Cloud online product that was targeted at the development of mobile applications. App Cloud allows companies to develop apps once using its online interface, and then deploy them as iPhone and Android native apps.

App Cloud was made generally available in November 2011. NBC used App Cloud to power its NBCU Screen It Emmy screener app for the iPad. The app allows 15,000 members of the Academy of Television Arts & Sciences who vote on the Emmy awards to gain authenticated access to view NBC's programs. The App Cloud was terminated in early 2013.

Products 

 Video Cloud
 Video Marketing Suite
 Enterprise Video Suite
 Brightcove Campaign
 Brightcove Continuum
 Brightcove Engage
 Player
 Live
 SSAI
 OTT Experiences
 Zencoder

Management
In November 2014, Brightcove brought on its new Chief Financial Officer Kevin R. Rhodes. He was later replaced by Robert Noreck, who had previously served as a Senior Vice President. Noreck assumed the role of Executive Vice President as well. In July 2017, the CEO David Mendels stepped down, after a year of poor stock performance. Andrew Feinberg who was the president and Chief Operating Officer of Brightcove earlier, was the acting CEO until Jeff Ray was named CEO in April 2018. Upon his retirement in February 2022, Ray was succeeded by Marc DeBevoise, former president of CBS Interactive and Chief Digital Officer of ViacomCBS.

References

External links 
 Brightcove Corporate
 Brightcove Studio

2004 establishments in Massachusetts
American companies established in 2004
Software companies established in 2004
Software companies based in Massachusetts
Video on demand services
Video hosting
Companies listed on the Nasdaq
Software companies of the United States
2012 initial public offerings